Richard Wombwell (1877 – 1943) was an English footballer. His regular position was as a forward. He was born in Nottingham, Nottinghamshire. He played for Bulwell, Ilkeston Town, Derby County, Bristol City, Manchester United, Heart of Midlothian, Brighton & Hove Albion, Blackburn Rovers and Ilkeston United. The highlight of his career came at Brighton when he scored the winning goal in a famous giant killing of Preston North End in 1908.

References

External links
Profile at StretfordEnd.co.uk
Profile at MUFCInfo.com

1877 births
Cricketers from Nottingham
1943 deaths
English footballers
Ilkeston Town F.C. (1880s) players
Derby County F.C. players
Bristol City F.C. players
Manchester United F.C. players
Heart of Midlothian F.C. players
Brighton & Hove Albion F.C. players
Blackburn Rovers F.C. players
Ilkeston United F.C. players
English Football League players
Scottish Football League players
Association football wingers